Havana is a restaurant in downtown Bar Harbor, Maine, United States. Established in 1997 by Michael Boland and his wife Deirdre Swords, the restaurant has received several awards, most notably for its wine list, which has achieved Wine Spectators Award for Excellence every year since 2004. A Cubano-influenced restaurant, it has an attached outdoor bar, the Havana Parrilla Tapas Bar and Grill, converted from a garage in 2003.

Sitting United States president Barack Obama dined at the restaurant on July 17, 2010, during his family's vacation on Mount Desert Island. The president had paella and the first lady, Michelle Obama, had lobster thermidor. It was the first presidential visit to the island since that of Howard Taft exactly a century earlier.

Boland and Swords opened a sister restaurant, named Havana South, in Portland, Maine, in 2010, but it closed shortly thereafter.

During the COVID-19 pandemic, Esquire included Havana in its list of "100 restaurants America can't afford to lose".

References

External links

Buildings and structures in Bar Harbor, Maine
Restaurants in Maine
Restaurants established in 1997
1997 establishments in Maine
Economy of Bar Harbor, Maine